Abu Sayyaf (ASG) is a radical Sunni Islamist group that has aggressively attacked civilians since the 1990s. It is notorious for beheading both military and civilian captives, especially when kidnap-for-ransom demands are not met. ASG victims include Filipino citizens as well as foreign nationals. Abu Sayyaf primarily operates in western Mindanao and the Sulu Archipelago of the southern Philippines.

List of incidents

Further reading 
 Timeline of Abu Sayyaf atrocities on GMA News
 What you need to know about the Abu Sayyaf by Levi A. So of The Philippine Star

See also 
List of terrorist incidents

References 

21st century in the Philippines
Kidnappings by Islamists
Murder in the Philippines
Terrorist incidents in the Philippines in the 2000s
Terrorist incidents in the Philippines in the 2010s
2000 murders in the Philippines
2001 murders in the Philippines
2002 murders in the Philippines
2007 murders in the Philippines
2009 murders in the Philippines
2010 murders in the Philippines
2011 murders in the Philippines
2013 murders in the Philippines
2015 murders in the Philippines
2016 murders in the Philippines
2017 murders in the Philippines
2018 murders in the Philippines
2019 murders in the Philippines
Terrorist incidents in the Philippines in 2000
Terrorist incidents in the Philippines in 2001
Terrorist incidents in the Philippines in 2002
Terrorist incidents in the Philippines in 2007
Terrorist incidents in the Philippines in 2009 
Terrorist incidents in the Philippines in 2010
Terrorist incidents in the Philippines in 2011
Terrorist incidents in the Philippines in 2013
Terrorist incidents in the Philippines in 2015
Terrorist incidents in the Philippines in 2016
Terrorist incidents in the Philippines in 2017
Terrorist incidents in the Philippines in 2018
Terrorist incidents in the Philippines in 2019